Fireflies in the Garden is a 2008 American drama film written and directed by Dennis Lee and starring Willem Dafoe, Ryan Reynolds, and Julia Roberts. It premiered at the 2008 Berlin International Film Festival and was released theatrically in the United States on October 14, 2011.

Set in the present day, the film revolves around a three-generation family using numerous flashbacks to childhood, with focus on the relationship between domineering Charles and his son Michael and sister-in-law Jane. A car accident on the way to a family reunion and the ensuing funeral set the scene for Michael to discover more about the inner lives and affairs of his family and a route to reconciliation.

Plot
English professor Charles and his son Michael, a successful author, have always had a strained relationship, with each pushing the other away. On a boyhood road trip, young Michael claims to have lost his glasses, knowing he has them in his pocket. Charles makes him walk home in the rain as punishment. The rule breaking and tit-for-tat continues over the years. Jane, the much younger sister of Charles's wife, Lisa, stays with them while Lisa is expecting. The baby "boy" later turns out to be a girl, Ryne. Jane has been close with Michael since childhood and sides with him against Charles.

Michael embarrasses Charles in front of the latter's colleagues by falsely claiming to have written Fireflies in the Garden, a poem by Robert Frost. Charles orders him to hold his weighted arms out horizontally as punishment. Jane later feeds Michael when he's unable to lift his aching arms. The conflicts build until Michael intervenes in a quarrel between his parents and forces Charles to the ground.

In present day, Ryne, now a college senior, picks up Michael at the airport. While Charles and Lisa drive to Jane's house for a party to celebrate Lisa's college graduation, Charles swerves to avoid hitting Christopher, Jane's son. The car hits a telephone pole, killing Lisa and severely injuring Charles.

Michael attempts to comfort Christopher and Leslie, Jane's daughter, by telling them Jane was his best friend before she was their mother. He takes them fishing with firecrackers, as he had with Jane growing up. He prompts them to lie to their mother about this. Jane chastises him lovingly after finding out, while Charles chastises him angrily. Things worsen when Michael has noisy sex with Kelly, his alcoholic ex-wife, who is there for the funeral.

Michael sees Christopher running off through a field and assures the latter he is not to blame for Lisa's death. Christopher insists on walking home alone after their talk, but disappears for several hours. Jane blames Michael, who deduces Christopher is at Lisa's grave. Michael discovers Lisa had been having an affair with her professor Addison and planning to leave Charles after graduation. Jane learns that Kelly is pregnant and newly sober and that Michael doesn't know.

Michael uses the title of the Frost poem as the title of his book about his childhood. The book contains revelations of sexual misconduct between Charles and one of his students during Lisa's pregnancy, Charles's grief over Lisa's death, Michael's joy over impending fatherhood, the happiness captured in a rare home movie of pregnant Lisa and Charles, and Jane helping Charles and Michael reconcile. No longer wanting to hurt his father, Michael destroys his manuscript.

Michael and Kelly reconcile and announce her pregnancy to the family before leaving. While discussing baby names with Ryne and Kelly, Michael mentions he likes "Max", the name Lisa had intended for Ryne.

Cast
 Ryan Reynolds as Michael Taylor
 Cayden Boyd as Young Michael Taylor
 Willem Dafoe as Professor Charles 'Charlie" Taylor
 Emily Watson as Jane Lawrence
 Hayden Panettiere as Young Jane Lawrence
 Carrie-Anne Moss as Kelly Hanson
 Julia Roberts as Lisa Lawrence-Taylor
 Ioan Gruffudd as Addison Wesley
 Shannon Lucio as Ryne Taylor
 George Newbern as James "Jimmy" Lawence
 Chase Ellison as Christopher Lawrence
 Brooklynn Proulx as Leslie Lawrence

Production
The film was shot in Austin (including the University of Texas), Bastrop, and Smithville, Texas. Lake Bastrop was site of fishing scene. The historic T. A. Hasler House in Bastrop was used significantly in the film.

Music
Javier Navarrete composed the score heard in the European release version, but when it was released in the US in 2011 in a reedited form it received a new score by Jane Antonia Cornish. Both scores received soundtrack albums, Navarrete's by Decca and Cornish's by BSX.

Javier Navarrete soundtrack album
 Town Of Austere 2:52
 11:11 4:07
 Fireflies Blinking 1:49
 A Swarm Of Silver Fish 5:06
 The Light Of A Fire 3:24
 Lisa 3:24
 The Field Of Gold 5:33
 Michael Smiles 2:15
 Fireflies In The Garden Suite 8:26
 Tchaikovsky: Piano Trio in A minor, Op.50 - 2. Variations - Vincent Trio 4:23

Jane Antonia Cornish soundtrack album
 Fireflies in the Garden 1:02
 Remembering Lisa 1:02
 Stay Away from Her 1:37
 Chasing Fireflies 1:02
 Fishing 1:22
 It's My Fault 3:03
 Running Away 1:50
 I Love You Big 2:16
 Sex at a Funeral 1:16
 Lisa :57
 Paint Cans 1:46
 Blowing up Fish 1:08
 Tablecloth 1:00
 Rules :46
 Car Crash 1:02
 Looking for Christopher 1:30
 Eleven Eleven 1:04
 I Love You Bigger 1:20

Reception
The film has received mostly negative reviews from critics. , it holds a 23% approval rating on Rotten Tomatoes based on 53 reviews, with an average rating of 4.30/10. The consensus states: "Despite boasting a stellar cast, Fireflies in the Garden is just tedious, dull and predictable melodrama. Instantly forgettable." On Metacritic, the film has a weighted average score of 34 out of 100, based on 14 critics, indicating "generally unfavorable reviews".

References

External links
 
 

2008 films
2008 drama films
2008 directorial debut films
American drama films
2000s English-language films
Films about autism
Films about dysfunctional families
Films set in 1989
Films set in 2007
Films shot in Texas
Films scored by Javier Navarrete
2000s American films